The North Carolina Council of State election of 2000 was held on 7 November 2000, to elect the Council of State.  On the same day, North Carolina held elections for Governor and for Lieutenant Governor, who also formally sit in the Council of State.

The new Council of State was formally inaugurated on January 6, 2001.

Results by office

Attorney General

State Auditor

Commissioner of Agriculture

Commissioner of Insurance

Commissioner of Labor

Incumbent Harry Payne did not run for reelection. Cherie Berry's victory was the first and only win by a Republican for a North Carolina Council of State office (excluding the Governor and Lieutenant Governor) in the 20th century (coming just weeks before the end of the century).

Secretary of State

Superintendent of Public Instruction

State Treasurer

Footnotes

Council of State
2000
North Carolina Council of State